Bear is an unincorporated community in Adams County in the U.S. state of Idaho.

History
Bear's population was 50 in 1909, and was just 5 in 1960.

References

Unincorporated communities in Adams County, Idaho
Unincorporated communities in Idaho